Bear Paw Ski Bowl is a small ski area which draws visitors primarily from Havre, Montana and the nearby Rocky Boys Indian Reservation located on the Chippewa Cree Recreation Area in north central Montana, along the Hi-Line.

External links
 Official Website

Buildings and structures in Hill County, Montana
Ski areas and resorts in Montana
Tourist attractions in Hill County, Montana